Rafael Azcona Fernández (24 October 1926 – 24 March 2008) was an awarded Spanish screenwriter and novelist who has worked with some of the best Spanish and international filmmakers.  Azcona won five Goya Awards during his career, including a lifetime achievement award in 1998.

He was born in the northern Spanish city Logroño on 24 October 1926. Azcona initially began his career writing for humor magazines. He became known as a screenwriter when he penned the screenplay for the film, El Pisito (The Little Apartment), which was based on his own novel. The 1959 film was directed by Italian film director, Marco Ferreri.

Azcona teamed up with director Fernando Trueba in “Belle Époque,” which won an Academy Award for best foreign film in 1994. He collaborated with other Spanish directors including Luis Garcia Berlanga, Jose Luis Cuerda, Jose Luis Garcia Sanchez, Pedro Olea,   and Carlos Saura. Azcona was also awarded the Spanish Fine Arts Gold Medal in 1994.

Rafael Azcona died at his home in Madrid, Spain, on 24 March 2008, at the age of 81.

Selected filmography as screenwriter 
 1959 : El pisito
 1959 : Se vende un tranvía
 1960 : El cochecito
 1961 : Plácido
 1961 : El secreto de los hombres azules
 1962 : Mafioso
 1962 : Les Quatre vérités
 1963 : La Donna scimmia
 1963 : The Conjugal Bed (L'Ape regina)
 1963 : El Verdugo
 1964 : The Ape Woman
 1964 : Un rincón para querernos
 1964 : Controsesso
 1965 : L'Uomo dei cinque palloni
 1965 : Oggi, domani, dopodomani
 1965 : Marcia nuziale
 1965 : Una Moglie americana
 1966 : L'estate
 1967 : Tuset Street
 1967 : Peppermint Frappé
 1967 : Las Pirañas
 1969 : La Madriguera
 1970 : ¡Vivan los novios!
 1970 : Las secretas intencions
 1970 : El Monumento
 1970 : El jardín de las delicias
 1971 : L'udienza
 1971 : El Ojo del huracán
 1971 : Un omicidio perfetto a termine di legge
 1972 : La Cera virgen
 1972 : Si può fare... amigo
 1972 : A Reason to Live, a Reason to Die
 1973 : Tarot
 1973 : Ana y los lobos
 1974 : The Marriage Revolution 
 1974 : Touche pas à la femme blanche, (Don't Touch The White Woman!)
 1974 : Permettete, signora, che ami vostra figlia
 1974 : La prima Angélica
 1974 : Grandeur nature
 1975 : El Poder del deseo
 1975 : Pim, pam, pum... ¡fuego!
 1976 : El Anacoreta
 1976 : La Dernière femme
 1977 : Mi hija Hildegart
 1978 : Un hombre llamado Flor de Otoño
 1978 : Ciao maschio
 1978 : La escopeta nacional
 1979 : La miel
 1979 : La familia, bien, gracias
 1981 : Patrimonio nacional
 1981 : 127 millones libres de impuestos
 1982 : Bésame, tonta
 1982 : Nacional III
 1983 : Don Chisciotte (TV)
 1983 : Los desastres de la guerra (TV)
 1985 : La vaquilla
 1985 : La corte de Faraón
 1986 : Hay que deshacer la casa
 1986 : El año de las luces
 1987 : El bosque animado
 1987 : El pecador impecable
 1987 : Moros y cristianos
 1988 : Come sono buoni i bianchi
 1988 : Pasodoble
 1988 : Soldadito español
 1989 : El vuelo de la paloma
 1989 : Blood and Sand (1989 film)
 1990 : La Mujer de tu vida: La mujer infiel (TV)
 1990 : Ay Carmela
 1992 : Chechu y familia
 1992 : Belle Époque
 1993 : Tirano Banderas
 1994 : La Mujer de tu vida 2: La mujer cualquiera (TV)
 1995 : Suspiros de España
 1995 : El Rey del río
 1995 : El Seductor
 1996 : Gran Slalom
 1997 : Tranvía a la Malvarrosa
 1997 : En brazos de la mujer madura
 1997 : Siempre hay un camino a la derecha
 1998 : Una pareja perfecta
 1998 : La niña de tus ojos
 1999 : La lengua de las mariposas
 2000 : Adiós con el corazón
 2001 : El paraíso ya no es lo que era
 2001 : Son de mar
 2002 : La marcha verde
 2004 : Franky Banderas
 2004 : María querida
 2008 : Los girasoles ciegos

References 

Rafael Azcona was survived by his wife Susan Youdelman and his two children, Daniel and Barbara Azcona.

External links 
 
 The Telegraph: Rafael Azcona: 'Belle Epoque' screenwriter
 The Times: Rafael Azcona, Spanish screenwriter who won an Oscar for Belle Epoque

1926 births
2008 deaths
People from Logroño
Spanish male screenwriters
Spanish novelists
Spanish male novelists
Deaths from lung cancer in Spain
Honorary Goya Award winners
20th-century Spanish novelists
20th-century Spanish male writers
20th-century screenwriters
20th-century Spanish screenwriters
21st-century Spanish screenwriters